Gerald Charles Wilson (born 25 December 1936) is an English former first-class cricketer.

Wilson made two appearances in first-class cricket for the Marylebone Cricket Club (MCC) in 1957, playing against Oxford University at Lord's, and on the MCC's Scottish tour against Scotland at Aberdeen. He took 3 wickets in his two matches with his right-arm medium pace bowling, while with the bat he scored 10 runs. Wilson was appointed the cricket coach at Millfield in 1959, a school which was founded by the Somerset cricketer Jack Meyer. It was a role he continued to hold in 1994.

References

External links

1936 births
Living people
People from Hayes, Hillingdon
English cricketers
Marylebone Cricket Club cricketers
English cricket coaches